For the educator, please see Charles Norfleet  Hunter

Charles Newton Hunter (January 11, 1906, Oneida, New York - June 14, 1978, Cheyenne, Wyoming) was the author of the book Galahad (1963) a first person account of the Burma Campaign in World War II.  Galahad was the code-name for the U.S. Army's 5307th Composite Unit (provisional), better known as Merrill's Marauders.  "Colonel Charles N. Hunter had been with Galahad from the beginning as its ranking or second ranking officer, had commanded it during its times of greatest trial, and was more responsible than any other individual for its record of achievement."

West Point
Hunter began his Army career as a West Point graduate.  From page 169 of the West Point "Howitzer" Yearbook, Class of 1929, we learn that he was known to his classmates as "Newt" from his middle name, "Newton."  He is described as having a "ruddy countenance, slightly tilted nose, sandy hair, and twinkling blue eyes carry an appeal that can pass unnoticed by no mortal lass."

WWII and Training for Burma
Following the Quebec meeting between President Roosevelt and Prime Minister Churchill a decision was made to create long range penetration groups to get behind the Japanese lines as a part of an overall Asian mainland offensive.

Lieutenant Colonel Hunter, with three years of experience in the Philippines, two years in the Canal Zone doing jungle warfare training, and most recently in charge of the combat training course in the infantry school, Fort Benning, Georgia, was put in charge of the shipment of the new unit to India and their subsequent training.

Merrill's Marauders and Burma
In February 1944, under command of Brigadier General Frank Merrill, 2,503 men and 360 mules began a 1,000 mile march - out of India, over the Patkai region of the Himalayas and deep into the Burmese jungle.

But on March 29, General Merrill suffered his first heart attack and command returned to then executive officer, Colonel Hunter.

Following months of forced marches through monsoon season, weakened by hunger and malnutrition, suffering from amoebic dysentery, malaria, various fevers, snake bite, scrub typhus, and fungal skin diseases they were reaching the end of their ability to continue.  Captain Fred O. Lyons said the last thing keeping him going had been not letting Colonel Hunter down:

August 3, 1944, following the last battle, Myitkyina was declared secure and on that day Col. Hunter was sent back to the United States.

After five major battles and seventeen minor engagements only two men survived without being hospitalized or killed. One was a Lieutenant Phil Weld, who later became famous for his single-handed ocean racing of small sailboats. The other was Colonel Charles N. Hunter.

After the war
After World War II, Colonel Hunter was Deputy Chief of Staff of the 4th Army and Commanding Officer of Fort Sam Houston in San Antonio, Texas.

He retired to Cheyenne, Wyoming, home of his wife, Don Mae, who died February 27, 1970, of heart failure. Of their three daughters, only his youngest, Sara is alive today.  Anne died in 1959 and Sue in 1977.

Quotation

Bibliography
Charles Newton Hunter, Galahad (San Antonio, TX: Naylor Co., 1963)
Charlton Ogburn, The Marauders (New York: Harper & Brothers, 1956)
Charles N. Hunter, AGF Report of Overseas Observations with Units in C.B.I. February 17, 1945.

See also
Merrill's Marauders
China Burma India Theater of World War II
Frank Merrill
Joseph Stilwell
Long range penetration
United States Army Rangers
Former United States special operations units
Special forces
Roy Matsumoto
David Richardson
Charlton Ogburn

Footnotes

American non-fiction writers
1906 births
1978 deaths
United States Military Academy alumni
United States Army Rangers
People from Oneida, New York
20th-century American historians
20th-century American male writers
Historians from New York (state)
American male non-fiction writers